The Best of Billy Ray Cyrus: Cover to Cover is a greatest hits album, released in 1997, by country music artist Billy Ray Cyrus. It features three newly released tracks — "It's All the Same to Me", "Cover to Cover", and "Bluegrass State of Mind" — as well as a reprise of "Trail of Tears" from his 1996 album of the same name. "It's All the Same to Me" was a Top 20 hit for Cyrus in 1997 on the Hot Country Songs charts.

Track listing 

 A^ New recording.

Personnel 
The following musicians played on the previously unreleased tracks.
 J. T. Corenflos – electric guitar
 Billy Ray Cyrus – lead vocals
 Stuart Duncan – fiddle
 Paul Leim – drums
 Brent Mason – electric guitar
 Dave Pomeroy – bass guitar
 Gary Prim – keyboards
 John Wesley Ryles – background vocals
 Biff Watson – acoustic guitar
 John D. Willis – acoustic guitar

Production 
 Keith Stegall and John Kelton (tracks 1-3)
 Terry Shelton and Billy Ray Cyrus (track 4)
 Joe Scaife and Jim Cotton (tracks 5-12)

Chart performance

Album

Singles

References 

1997 greatest hits albums
Billy Ray Cyrus albums
Mercury Records compilation albums